Underworld is a series of dark fantasy action horror films created by Len Wiseman, Kevin Grevioux, and Danny McBride, that follows characters who are caught up in a war between vampires and werewolves (called "lycans" within the films). Most of the films star Kate Beckinsale as Selene, based on the Marvel Comics character of the same name. The first film, Underworld, was released in 2003; it introduces Selene, an elite vampire-warrior who defies her orders, and Michael Corvin (Scott Speedman), a human who gets caught up in the war. The second film, Underworld: Evolution (released in 2006) follows Selene and Michael as they are hunted by their enemies. The third film, Underworld: Rise of the Lycans (2009), is the prequel to the series, chronicling the origins of the vampire-lycan war. The fourth film, Underworld: Awakening (2012) is the sequel to Underworld: Evolution. In this film, humans have discovered the existence of vampires and lycans, and are trying to eradicate both species. A final film, titled Underworld: Blood Wars, was released internationally on November 24, 2016, and in the United States on January 6, 2017.

The series received generally negative reviews from critics, but amassed a strong fan following and grossed a total of $539 million, against a combined budget of $207 million.

Films

Underworld (2003)

Underworld tells the story of Selene (Kate Beckinsale) a Death Dealer bent on destroying the lycans who allegedly killed her family. She discovers that the lycans are pursuing a human, Michael Corvin, for experimentation; Selene captures Michael herself to find out what the lycans are up to. Along the way, Selene not only discovers a mutinous plot to destroy the vampire Elders, but also a shocking revelation about her father figure Elder, Viktor.

The vampires and lycans are not supernatural creatures, but rather the product of a mutation of the Plague.

It is revealed in the film that Alexander Corvinus is the first of the vampire and lycan lines. He was the only survivor of the plague that wiped out his village. Somehow, his body was able to mutate the pathogen, mold it to his own benefit. He had three sons, two of whom inherited their father's immortality and were bitten, one, Markus, by a bat, and the other, William, by a wolf, resulting in the vampire and werewolf lines. Corvinus's unnamed third son, who did not inherit immortality, also carried the Corvinus Strain as an exact duplicate of the original pathogen, hidden away in his genetic code and passed along to his human descendants through the centuries. This, according to Singe, is the key to creating a hybrid.

Underworld: Evolution (2006)

In Underworld: Evolution, Selene takes Michael to a vampire safe house and plans to return to Viktor's estate to awaken Markus, the last vampire Elder. Before she can return, Markus confronts her, having been awakened by the blood of the lycan scientist, Singe, after he was killed. Markus does not seem keen to help Selene and wishes to steal her memories for information. While on the run from Markus, Selene and Michael discover that Markus is the first vampire and that he plans to free his imprisoned brother, William, the first and most savage werewolf.

Underworld: Rise of the Lycans (2009)

Underworld: Rise of the Lycans is a 2009 American film directed by Patrick Tatopoulos. It is the third installment (chronologically the first) in the Underworld series, focusing primarily on the origins of some characters and the events leading to the vampirelycan war, depicted in the previous films Underworld and Underworld: Evolution.

As shown in the film, the original werewolves were uncontrollable beasts, unable to retake human form once bitten. However, there was a single werewolf who gave birth to a human-looking child. This child carried a mutation of the original pathogen, permitting him to alternate between human and werewolf form. He was Lucian, dubbed by Viktor as "the first of the lycans".

The vampires used the lycans as slaves to be the guardians of their lairs during the daylight hours and labor during the night. However, Viktor's daughter, Sonja, and Lucian fell in love and she became pregnant. Lucian, the lycan leader, led a revolt after Viktor killed Sonja to prevent the blending of the species.

Underworld: Awakening (2012)

A fourth film, entitled Awakening, shot in 3D, was directed by Måns Mårlind and Björn Stein and released on January 20, 2012. Kate Beckinsale reprises her role as Selene and screenwriter John Hlavin stated prior to the film's release that it will not be like any of the previous films. Production began in March 2011 in Vancouver with Tom Rosenberg, Gary Lucchesi, and Len Wiseman producing. On April 4, 2011, the title of the film was announced and the following plot synopsis was given:

Kate Beckinsale, star of the first two films, returns in her lead role as the vampire death dealer Selene, who escapes imprisonment to find herself in a world where humans have discovered the existence of both vampire and lycan clans, and are conducting an all-out war to eradicate both immortal species.
Selene also learns that she has a hybrid daughter born while she was imprisoned, who has the ability to see through her parents' eyes. The same goes for Selene, who has the ability to see through the child's eyes and uses it to find her daughter several times in the film.

Underworld: Blood Wars (2016)

On August 27, 2014, Lakeshore Entertainment announced plans to reboot the franchise. Cory Goodman was hired to write the script for the first film. Tom Rosenberg and Gary Lucchesi would be producers. Later it was confirmed not to be a reboot but another entry in the series. The fifth film, originally tentatively titled Underworld: Next Generation, was in production with Kate Beckinsale reprising her role as Selene and Anna Foerster set to direct the fifth film in Prague in October. Theo James was set to reprise his role as David from the fourth film as the new lead, but said that "[his] involvement in it is... I think it's going to be very difficult to do that with these Divergent movies, and my other commitments." James however remained in the film to fulfill an option agreement. It was announced by Deadline that Tobias Menzies was cast as Marius, a mysterious new lycan leader who'd more than likely go toe-to-toe with Selene and her vampire clan. In September 2015, Deadline reported that Bradley James was hired as the villain Varga, Clementine Nicholson as Lena (the Nordic Coven's greatest warrior and daughter of Vidar), and Lara Pulver as Semira.

The film was released internationally on November 24, 2016, and in the United States on January 6, 2017.

Future
In September 2018, Beckinsale cast doubt on appearing in a sixth Underworld film. By July 2021 however, she stated that she was not opposed to reprising the role.

Cancelled projects

I, Frankenstein crossover

In 2014, a crossover with the film I, Frankenstein was planned by Kevin Grevioux, co-creator of the Underworld franchise and creator of the I, Frankenstein graphic novel. He stated in a pre-release interview that, in an early draft of his screenplay, Beckinsale would have made a post-credit cameo appearance as Selene and that there would have been Underworld easter eggs, but none of this was used.

Blade crossover

In October 2016, Kate Beckinsale stated that a crossover film between Underworld and the Blade franchise, featuring Wesley Snipes reprising his role as Blade, had been in development and discussed with Marvel the previous year, but was declined after Marvel Studios regained the film rights to the character and planned to introduce the character into the Marvel Cinematic Universe (MCU).

Resident Evil crossover

In 2016, producer David Kern revealed that a crossover film with the Resident Evil film series had also been considered.

Short films

Underworld: Endless War (2011)

Underworld: Endless War is a 2011 animated film, which includes three individual short films beginning in 1890 and leading up to the events of Underworld: Awakening. The film follows Selene as she hunts down a group of three lycan brothers in three separate time periods.

Television
In October 2014, Wiseman announced plans to expand the film series into a franchise with the possibility of spin-offs in addition to a television series. In January 2016, the filmmaker confirmed that he is still developing the series though there is no timetable for when it will debut. He stated that the series will explore characters that tie into the film series.

The series officially entered development in September 2017. Wiseman was announced to return to the franchise as executive producer. The filmmaker stated that the series will be a "pretty big departure from the films", specifying that the tone and character of the show will be different. The series will be a joint-venture production between Sony Pictures Television, Screen Gems, Sketch Films, Lakeshore Entertainment, and 20th Century Television.

Recurring cast and characters

 A  indicates the actor portrayed the role of a younger version of the character.
 An  indicates a role as an older version of the character.
 A  indicates the actor or actress lent only his or her voice for his or her film character.
 A  indicates a cameo appearance.
 An  indicates an appearance through archival footage.
 A dark gray cell indicates the character was not in the film.

Additional crew and production details

Development
In September 2003, shortly after the release of Underworld, production companies Screen Gems and Lakeshore planned to release a prequel as the third film following Underworlds sequel, Underworld: Evolution. Kate Beckinsale, who portrayed Selene in Underworld, expressed interest in reprising her role for the sequel and the prequel.

In December 2005, Underworld: Evolution director Len Wiseman explained that the Underworld franchise was originally conceived as a trilogy. Wiseman said: "We sort of mapped out an entire history and story... a massive collection of ideas and stories that we're putting out at certain times." Wiseman anticipated creating a third installment for the franchise based on the audiences' reception of Underworld: Evolution, which would be released the following month.

In a June 2006 interview, Wiseman said, "The third film is going to be a prequel. It will be the origin story and we find out things we didn't know about Lucian; he'll have a much bigger part in it. It will be about the creation [of the races] and what started the war. It will be a period piece. The film will also focus for the first time through the lycans' point of view." The director also shared, "In terms of the writing, a lot of the writing has been done. We've been developing Underworld 3 for a while. I won't be directing Underworld: Rise of the Lycans; I'm just going to be producing and writing." When asked if Kate Beckinsale would reprise her role as Selene in the prequel, Wiseman said, "It will be in the time period before, but it will overlap into the creation of her as well. We're in the process of seeing how far we go with that." The following October, actor Michael Sheen, who portrays Lucian in the film series, expressed interest in being part of the prequel.

The Hollywood Reporter announced that the film would be written by Danny McBride and mark the directorial début of Patrick Tatopoulos, who designed the creature effects for all three Underworld films. Len Wiseman would produce, and contribute to the writing of this film, but would not direct, nor would Kate Beckinsale reprise her lead role of Selene nor would Scott Speedman reprise his role of Michael. In late September 2007, Outlander scribes Dirk Blackman and Howard McCain were brought on board and delivered a draft on November 3, mere days before the 2007-2008 Writers Guild of America strike. Pre-production began shortly thereafter.

The prequel film was shot in Auckland, New Zealand and in Roxboro, North Carolina. There is a brief pickup shot of Tenaya Lake in Yosemite National Park as well.

In a 2009 interview, Underworld co-creator Kevin Grevioux revealed that he had based the Selene character off of the Marvel Comics character of the same name, without the company's permission.

Filming for Underworld: Awakening began in March 2011 at Simon Fraser University in Vancouver, British Columbia. Underworld: Awakening is the first film to be shot using RED EPIC digital cameras in 3D.

Reception

Box office performance

Critical and public response

In other media
There have been various spin-offs and tie-ins in a range of other media.

IDW Publishing has published a number of Underworld comics, including Underworld: Red in Tooth and Claw, and also an adaptation of the third film Rise of the Lycans written by Kevin Grevioux which was published and released in 2009.

In addition to the novelizations of Underworld and Underworld: Evolution, there is an original novel written by Greg Cox, published by Pocket Star Books in 2004, titled Underworld: Blood Enemy; written before Evolution, it depicts an alternate origin to the war, based on such details as Sonja's initial portrayal as a blonde in flashbacks.

In September 2003, Sony contracted with Black Widow Games for the production of Underworld: Bloodline (a Half-Life mod). An action video game based on the first film entitled The Eternal War was scheduled for release on the PlayStation 2 and Xbox consoles in 2004, but it only saw release for the PlayStation 2 in Europe, and was cancelled in all other regions.

References

External links

 

 
Action film series
American dark fantasy films
Fantasy film series
Film series based on Marvel Comics
Film series introduced in 2003
Screen Gems films
Screen Gems franchises
Vampire film series
Werewolf films